Patrick Kehoe (6 June 1922 – 4 February 2016) was an Irish Gaelic football and hurling manager as well as a dual player at the highest levels as a right wing-forward with the Wexford senior teams.

Honours

Gusserane O'Rahillys
Wexford Senior Football Championship (4): 1945, 1946, 1947, 1954

Horeswood
Wexford Junior Hurling Championship (1): 1947

Wexford
All-Ireland Senior Hurling Championship (2): 1955, 1956 (
Leinster Senior Hurling Championship (4): 1951, 1954 (sub), 1955 (sub), 1956
Leinster Senior Football Championship (1): 1945

References

1922 births
2016 deaths
Dual players
Horeswood hurlers
Gusserane O'Rahillys hurlers
Gusserane O'Rahillys Gaelic footballers
Wexford inter-county hurlers
Wexford inter-county Gaelic footballers